The 95th Division was created in March 1949 under the Regulation of the Redesignations of All Organizations and Units of the Army, issued by Central Military Commission on November 1, 1948, basing on the 5th New-formed Division, Jiaodong Column of the PLA Huadong Military District. 5th New-formed Division was formed in March 1948.

The division was part of the 32nd Corps. Under the flag of 95th Division it took part in the Chinese Civil War. In October 1950 32rd Corps was disbanded and the division was absorbed into the Air Force. On February 14, 1951, the division was reorganized and renamed as the PLAAFùs 14th Fighter Division.

As of reorganization the division was composed of:
283rd Regiment;
284th Regiment;
285th Regiment.

References

中国人民解放军各步兵师沿革，http://blog.sina.com.cn/s/blog_a3f74a990101cp1q.html

Infantry divisions of the People's Liberation Army
Military units and formations established in 1949
Military units and formations disestablished in 1951